Between 1958 and the outbreak of the Libyan civil war in 2011, there were twelve ambassadors appointed by the Libyan government to serve in France. Subsequent postholders have represented the National Transitional Council.

References

Source
 Legifrance | Accueil | Les autres textes législatifs et réglementaires | Remise de lettres de créance

Ambassadors of Libya to France
France
Libya